HNLMS Pieter Florisz was a  of the Royal Netherlands Navy and Nazi Germany's Kriegsmarine during World War II.

Service history
Scuttled at Enkhuizen on 14 May 1940 after the Dutch surrender, the ship was salvaged by the Germans and commissioned into the Kriegsmarine.

In December 1940 she was converted to a torpedo recovery vessel and renamed M 551. In August 1944 the ship was assigned to the 27th U-boat Flotilla, responsible for the tactical training of U-boats.

In 1945 she was returned to the Royal Netherlands Navy, and repaired at the Willemsoord, Den Helder. Recommissioned under her original name in mid-1946, the ship served as fishery inspection vessel. On 16 September 1947 she sailed for the Dutch East Indies where she served as a patrol vessel, and later as a minesweeper with the 1st Flotilla at Surabaya. After her return to the Netherlands in 1950 the ship was converted to boom defence vessel.

Struck in 1961 and transferred to the Zeekadetkorps Nederland (Dutch Sea Cadets) at IJmuiden in 1962, the ship was finally decommissioned in September 1976 and sold for scrap.

Jan van Amstel-class minesweepers
Ships built in Rotterdam
1937 ships
World War II minesweepers of the Netherlands
Naval ships of the Netherlands captured by Germany during World War II
Maritime incidents in May 1940